The Monument to the Discovering Faith, popularly known as el Monumento a Colón ("the Monument to Columbus") is a monument in Huelva, Spain. It is a work by Gertrude Vanderbilt Whitney.

Funded via a popular subscription in the United States channeled by the Columbus Memorial Fund Inc., the monument, 37-metre high, was built from 1927 to 1929. Erected on the Punta del Sebo, the confluence of the Tinto and Odiel rivers, it was inaugurated on 21 April 1929, during a ceremony attended by Prime Minister Miguel Primo de Rivera and the US ambassador Ogden H. Hammond.

The sculpted man (leaning on a Tau cross) is sometimes described as representing a friar from La Rábida, yet it originally was described (including by the author herself) as a statue of Christopher Columbus.

It consists of a mortar structure covered by ashlar masonry (calcarenite).

References 
Citations

Bibliography
 
 

Colossal statues in Spain
Monuments and memorials in Andalusia
Outdoor sculptures in Andalusia
Sculptures of men in Spain
Huelva
Statues of Christopher Columbus
Monuments and memorials to Christopher Columbus
Buildings and structures in the Province of Huelva
Sculptures by Gertrude Vanderbilt Whitney